Cynthia Ann Stephanie Lauper Thornton (born June 22, 1953) is an American singer, songwriter, actress, and activist. Her career has spanned over 40 years. Her album She's So Unusual (1983) was the first debut album by a female artist to achieve four top-five hits on the Billboard Hot 100—"Girls Just Want to Have Fun", "Time After Time", "She Bop", and "All Through the Night"—and earned Lauper the Best New Artist award at the 27th Annual Grammy Awards in 1985. Her success continued with the soundtrack for the motion picture The Goonies (1985) and her second record True Colors (1986). This album included the number-one single "True Colors" and "Change of Heart", which peaked at number three. In 1989, she had a hit with "I Drove All Night".

Since 1983, Lauper has released eleven studio albums and participated in many other projects. In 2010, Memphis Blues became Billboard most successful blues album of the year, remaining at number one on the Billboard Blues Albums chart for 13 consecutive weeks. In 2013, she won the Tony Award for best original score for composing the Broadway musical Kinky Boots, making her the first woman to win the category by herself. The musical was awarded five other Tonys including Tony Award for Best New Musical. In 2014, Lauper was awarded the Grammy Award for Best Musical Theater Album for the cast recording. In 2016, the West End production won Best New Musical at the Olivier Awards.

Lauper has sold over 50 million records worldwide. She has won awards at the Grammys, Emmys, Tonys, the New York's Outer Critics Circle, MTV Video Music Awards (VMAs), Billboard Awards, and American Music Awards (AMAs). An inductee into both the Songwriters Hall of Fame and the Hollywood Walk of Fame, Lauper is one of the few singers to win three of the four major American entertainment awards (EGOT). She won the inaugural Best Female Video prize at the 1984 VMAs for "Girls Just Want to Have Fun".  This music video is recognized by MTV, VH1 and Rolling Stone as one of the greatest music videos of the era. She is featured in the Rock and Roll Hall of Fame's Women Who Rock exhibit. Her debut album is included in Rolling Stone list of the 500 Greatest Albums of All Time, while "Time After Time" is included in VH1's list of the 100 Best Songs of the Past 25 years. VH1 has ranked Lauper No. 58 of the 100 Greatest Women of Rock & Roll.

Lauper is known for her distinctive image, featuring a variety of hair colors and eccentric clothing, and for her powerful and distinctive four-octave singing range. She has been celebrated for her humanitarian work, particularly as an advocate for LGBT rights in the United States. Her charitable efforts were acknowledged in 2013 when she was invited as a special guest to attend U.S. President Barack Obama's second inauguration.

Life and career

1953–1979: Early life
Lauper was born in Brooklyn, New York City, to a Catholic family. Her father, Fred, was of Swiss-German descent, and a direct descendant of Christen Lauper, a leader of the Swiss peasant war of 1653. Her mother, Catrine (née Gallo) (1930-2022), was of Italian descent (from Sicily). Lauper's siblings are her younger brother Fred (nicknamed Butch), and older sister, Ellen. Lauper's parents divorced when she was five. Her mother remarried and divorced again.

Lauper grew up in the Ozone Park neighborhood of Queens and, as a child, listened to such artists as The Beatles and Judy Garland. At age 12, she began writing songs and playing an acoustic guitar given to her by her sister.

Lauper expressed herself with a variety of hair colors and eccentric clothing, and took a friend's advice to spell her name as "Cyndi" rather than "Cindy". Her unconventional sense of style led to classmates bullying and throwing stones at her.

Lauper went to Richmond Hill High School, but was expelled although she later earned her GED. She left home at 17, to escape her abusive stepfather, intending to study art. Her journey took her to Canada, where she spent two weeks in the woods with her dog Sparkle, trying to find herself. She eventually traveled to Vermont, where she took art classes at Johnson State College and supported herself working odd jobs. In 2019, Lauper gave the commencement address at Northern Vermont University - Johnson, the academic institution that now includes Johnson State. At this event, NVU awarded her the honorary degree of Doctor of Letters.

In the early 1970s, Lauper performed as a vocalist with various cover bands. One, called Doc West, covered disco songs as well as Janis Joplin. A later band, Flyer, was active in the New York metropolitan area, singing hits by bands including Bad Company, Jefferson Airplane and Led Zeppelin. Although Lauper was performing on stage, she was not happy singing covers. In 1977, Lauper damaged her vocal cords and took a year off from singing. She was told by doctors that she would never sing again, but regained her voice with the help of vocal coach Katie Agresta.

1980–1982: Blue Angel

In 1978, Lauper met saxophone player John Turi through her manager Ted Rosenblatt. Turi and Lauper formed a band named Blue Angel and recorded a demo tape of original music. Steve Massarsky, manager of The Allman Brothers Band, heard the tape and liked Lauper's voice. He bought Blue Angel's contract for $5,000 and became their manager.

Lauper received recording offers as a solo artist, but held out, wanting the band to be included in any deal she made. Blue Angel was eventually signed by Polydor Records and released a self-titled album on the label in 1980. Lauper hated the album cover, saying that it made her look like Big Bird, but Rolling Stone magazine later included it as one of the 100 best new wave album covers (2003). Despite critical acclaim, the album sold poorly ("It went lead", as Lauper later joked) and the band broke up. The members of Blue Angel had a falling-out with Massarsky and fired him as their manager. He later filed an $80,000 suit against them, which forced Lauper into bankruptcy. After this Lauper temporarily lost her voice due to an inverted cyst in her vocal cord.

After Blue Angel broke up, Lauper spent time, due to her financial problems, working in retail stores, waitressing at IHOP (which she quit after being demoted to hostess when the manager sexually harassed her), and singing in local clubs. Her most frequent gigs were at El Sombrero. Music critics who saw Lauper perform with Blue Angel believed she had star potential due to her four-octave singing range. In 1981, while singing in a local New York bar, Lauper met David Wolff, who took over as her manager and had her sign a recording contract with Portrait Records, a subsidiary of Epic Records.

1983–1985: She's So Unusual

On October 14, 1983, Lauper released her first solo album, She's So Unusual. The album became a worldwide hit, peaking at No. 4 in the U.S. and reaching the top five in eight other countries. The primary studio musicians were Eric Bazilian and Rob Hyman (of The Hooters), Rick Chertoff, Richard Termini and Peter Wood. Lauper became popular with teenagers and critics, in part due to her hybrid punk image, which was crafted by stylist Patrick Lucas.

Lauper co-wrote four songs on She's So Unusual, including the hits "Time After Time" and "She Bop".  On the songs she did not write, Lauper sometimes changed the lyrics. Such is the case with "Girls Just Want to Have Fun". Lauper found the original lyrics to be misogynistic, so she rewrote the song as an anthem for young women.

The album includes five cover songs, including The Brains' new wave track "Money Changes Everything" (No. 27 on the Billboard Hot 100) and Prince's "When You Were Mine". The album made Lauper the first female artist to have four consecutive Billboard Hot 100 top five hits from one album. The LP stayed in the Top 200 charts for more than 65 weeks, and since has sold 16 million copies worldwide.

Cyndi won Best New Artist at the 1985 Grammy Awards. She's So Unusual also received nominations for Album of the Year, Record of the Year, Best Female Pop Vocal Performance (for "Girls Just Want to Have Fun"), and Song of the Year (for "Time After Time"). She wore almost a pound of necklaces at her award ceremony. It also won the Grammy for Best Album Package, which went to the art director, Janet Perr.

The video for "Girls Just Want to Have Fun" won the inaugural award for Best Female Video at the 1984 MTV Video Music Awards, and made Lauper an MTV staple. The video featured professional wrestling manager "Captain" Lou Albano as Lauper's father, and her real-life mother, Catrine, as her mother, and also featured her attorney, her manager, her brother Butch, and her dog Sparkle. In 1984–85, Lauper appeared on the covers of Rolling Stone magazine, Time, and Newsweek. She appeared twice on the cover of People, and was named a Ms. magazine Woman of the Year in 1985.

In 1985, Lauper participated in USA for Africa's famine-relief fund-raising single "We Are the World", which sold more than 20 million copies since then.

Lauper appeared with professional wrestler Hulk Hogan, who played her "bodyguard" and would also later make many appearances as herself in a number of the World Wrestling Federation's "Rock 'n' Wrestling Connection" events, and played Wendi Richter's manager in the inaugural WrestleMania event. Dave Wolff, Lauper's boyfriend and manager at the time, was a wrestling fan as a boy, and engineered the rock and wrestling connection.

In 1985, Lauper released the single "The Goonies 'R' Good Enough", from the soundtrack to the movie The Goonies, and an accompanying video which featured several wrestling stars. The song reached number 10 on the Billboard Hot 100 chart.

1986–1988: True Colors and Vibes
Lauper received a nomination at the 1986 Grammy Awards: Best Female Rock Vocal Performance for "What a Thrill," another in the same category the following year (for the album track “911”) and yet another in 1988, Best Long Form Music Video for Cyndi Lauper in Paris.

Lauper released her second album, True Colors in 1986. It entered the Billboard 200 at No. 42 and rose to its #4 peak.

In 1986, Lauper appeared on the Billy Joel album The Bridge, with a song called "Code of Silence". She is credited as having written the lyrics with Joel and she sings a duet with him. In the same year, Lauper also sang the theme song for the series Pee-wee's Playhouse, credited as "Ellen Shaw". In 1987, David Wolff produced a concert film for Lauper called Cyndi Lauper in Paris. The concert was broadcast on HBO.

Lauper made her film debut in August 1988 in the quirky comedy Vibes, alongside Jeff Goldblum, Peter Falk, and Julian Sands. Lauper played a psychic in search of a city of gold in South America. Deborah Blum and Tony Ganz produced the film, with David Wolff as associate producer. To prepare for the role, Lauper took a few classes in finger waving and hair setting at the Robert Fiancé School of Beauty in New York, and studied with a few Manhattan psychics. The film flopped and was poorly received by critics, but would later be considered a cult classic.

Lauper contributed a track called "Hole in My Heart (All the Way to China)" for the Vibes soundtrack, but the song was not included. A music video was released, a high energy, comic action/adventure romp through a Chinese laundry. The song reached No. 54 on the US charts, but fared better in Australia, reaching No. 8.

1989–1992: A Night to Remember and marriage
A Night to Remember – Lauper's third album – was released in the spring of 1989. The album had one hit, the No. 6 single "I Drove All Night", originally recorded by Roy Orbison, three years before his death on December 6, 1988. Lauper received a Grammy nomination for Best Female Rock Vocal Performance at the 1990 Grammy Awards for "I Drove All Night", but overall album sales for A Night to Remember were down. The music video for the album's song "My First Night Without You" was one of the first to be closed-captioned for the hearing impaired.

Because of a friendship with Yoko Ono, Lauper took part in the May 1990 John Lennon tribute concert in Liverpool, performing the Beatles song "Hey Bulldog", and the John Lennon song "Working Class Hero". She also took part in Ono and Lennon's son Sean's project called "The Peace Choir", performing a new version of Lennon's "Give Peace a Chance".

On November 24, 1991, Lauper married actor David Thornton.

1993–1995: Hat Full of Stars and Twelve Deadly Cyns
Lauper's fourth album Hat Full of Stars was released in June 1993 and was met with critical acclaim, but failed commercially, unsupported by her label. The album, which tackled such topics as homophobia, spousal abuse, racism, and abortion sold fewer than 120,000 copies in the United States and peaked at No. 112 on the Billboard charts. The video for the album's song "Sally's Pigeons" features the then-unknown Julia Stiles as the young Cyndi.

In 1993, Lauper returned to acting, playing Michael J. Fox's ditzy secretary in Life with Mikey. She also won an Emmy Award for her role as Marianne Lugasso in the sitcom Mad About You.

1996–2000: Motherhood and Sisters of Avalon

On November 19, 1997, Lauper gave birth to her son, Declyn Wallace Lauper Thornton. Her fifth album, Sisters of Avalon, was released in Japan in 1996, and elsewhere in 1997. The album was written and produced with the help of Jan Pulsford (Lauper's keyboard player) and producer Mark Saunders. As in Hat Full of Stars, some of the songs in Sisters of Avalon addressed dark themes. The song "Ballad of Cleo and Joe" addressed the complications of a drag queen's double life. The song "Say a Prayer" was written for a friend of hers who had died from AIDS. "Unhook the Stars" was used in the movie of the same name. Again without support from her label, the release failed in America, spending a single week on the Billboard album chart at No. 188. This album also met with much critical praise, including People magazine, which declared it "'90s nourishment for body and soul. Lauper sets a scene, makes us care, gives us hope."

On January 17, 1999, Lauper appeared as an animated version of herself in The Simpsons episode "Wild Barts Can't Be Broken", singing the National Anthem to the melody of "Girls Just Want to Have Fun". That same year, Lauper opened for Cher's Do You Believe? Tour alongside Wild Orchid. She also appeared in the films Mrs. Parker and the Vicious Circle and The Opportunists. She contributed to the soundtrack of the 2000 animated film, Rugrats in Paris: The Movie, performing the song "I Want a Mom That Will Last Forever".

2001–2004: Shine and At Last
On October 12, 2000, Lauper took part in the television show Women in Rock, Girls with Guitars performing with Ann Wilson of Heart and with the girl group, Destiny's Child. A CD of the songs performed was released exclusively to Sears stores from September 30 to October 31, 2001, and was marketed as a fundraiser for breast cancer.

In 2002, Sony issued a best-of CD, The Essential Cyndi Lauper. Lauper also released a cover album with Sony/Epic Records entitled At Last (formerly Naked City), which was released in 2003. At Last received one nomination at the 2005 Grammy Awards: Best Instrumental Arrangement Accompanying Vocalist(s), for "Unchained Melody". The effort was also a commercial hit, selling 4.5 million records

In April 2004, Lauper performed during the VH1's benefit concert Divas Live 2004 alongside Ashanti, Gladys Knight, Jessica Simpson, Joss Stone and Patti LaBelle, in support of the Save the Music Foundation.

2005–2007: The Body Acoustic
She made appearances on Showtime's hit show Queer as Folk in 2005, directed a commercial for Totally 80s edition of the board game Trivial Pursuit in 2006, served as a judge on the 6th Annual Independent Music Awards and made her Broadway debut in the Tony-nominated The Threepenny Opera as Jenny. She performed with Shaggy, Scott Weiland of Velvet Revolver/Stone Temple Pilots, Pat Monahan of Train, Ani DiFranco, and The Hooters in the VH1 Classics special Decades Rock Live. In 2006, she sang "Message To Michael" with Dionne Warwick and "Beecharmer" with Nellie McKay on McKay's Pretty Little Head album.

On October 16, 2006, Lauper was inducted into the Long Island Music Hall of Fame. In 2007, she served as a guest performer on the song "Lady in Pink" on an episode of the Nick Jr. show, The Backyardigans.

2008–2009: Bring Ya to the Brink

Lauper's sixth studio album, Bring Ya to the Brink was released in the United States on May 27, 2008.

Other projects for 2008 included the True Colors Tour and a Christmas duet with Swedish band The Hives, entitled "A Christmas Duel". The song was released as a CD single and a 7" vinyl in Sweden. Lauper also performed on the "Girls Night Out", headlining it with Rosie O'Donnell in the US.

On November 17, 2009, Lauper performed a collaborative work with Wyclef Jean called "Slumdog Millionaire", performing it on the Late Show with David Letterman.

2010–2012: The Celebrity Apprentice, Memphis Blues, memoir
In January 2010, Mattel released a Cyndi Lauper Barbie doll as part of their "Ladies of the 80s" series.

In March 2010, Lauper appeared on NBC's The Celebrity Apprentice, coming in sixth place.

Memphis Blues—Lauper's 7th studio album—was released on June 22, 2010, and debuted on the Billboard Blues Albums chart at No. 1, and at No. 26 on the Billboard Top 200. The album remained No. 1 on the Blues Albums chart for 14 consecutive weeks; Memphis Blues was nominated for Best Traditional Blues Album at the 2011 Grammy Awards.

Lauper made international news in March 2011 for an impromptu performance of "Girls Just Want to Have Fun" while waiting for a delayed flight at Aeroparque Jorge Newbery in Buenos Aires. A video was later posted on YouTube.

In November 2011, she released two Christmas singles exclusive to iTunes. The first release was a Blues-inspired cover of Elvis Presley's classic "Blue Christmas", and the second was a new version of "Home for the holidays", a duet with Norah Jones. In June 2012, Lauper made her first appearance for WWE in 27 years, to promote WWE Raw's 1000th episode to memorialize "Captain" Lou Albano.

In September 2012, Lauper performed at fashion designer Betsey Johnson's 40 year Retrospective Fashion show. She also released a New York Times best selling memoir that detailed her struggle with child abuse and depression.

2013–2015: Kinky Boots and touring
Lauper composed music and lyrics for the Broadway musical Kinky Boots, with Harvey Fierstein writing the book. The musical was based on the 2006 independent film Kinky Boots. It opened in Chicago in October 2012 and on Broadway at the Al Hirschfeld Theatre on April 4, 2013. In May, she won Best Score for Kinky Boots at the 63rd annual Outer Critics Circle Awards. The musical led the 2013 Tony Awards, with 13 nominations and six wins including Best Musical and Best Actor. She won the award for Best Original Score. Lauper was the first woman to win solo in this category. After a six-year run and 2,507 regular shows, Kinky Boots ended its Broadway run on April 7, 2019. It is the 25th-longest-running Broadway musical in history. It grossed $297 million on Broadway.

In the summer of 2013, in celebration of the 30th anniversary of her debut album She's So Unusual, Lauper embarked on an international tour covering America and Australia. The show consisted of a mix of fan favorites and the entirety of the She's So Unusual record. She was a guest on 36 dates of Cher's Dressed to Kill Tour, starting April 23, 2014. A new album was confirmed by Lauper on a website interview.

Lauper hosted the Grammy Pre-Telecast at the Nokia Theatre, L.A. on Jan 26, where she later accepted a Grammy for Kinky Boots (Best Musical Theater Album).

On April 1 (March 1 in Europe), Lauper released the 30th Anniversary edition of She's So Unusual through Epic Records It featured a remastered version of the original album plus three new remixes. The Deluxe Edition featured bonus tracks such as demos and a live recording as well as a 3D cut-out of the bedroom featured in the 'Girls Just Want to Have Fun' music video with a reusable sticker set.

On September 17, 2014, Lauper sang on the finale of America's Got Talent. On September 25, as part of the Today Show's Shine a Light series, Lauper re-recorded "True Colors" in a mashup with Sara Bareilles' "Brave" to raise awareness and money for children battling cancer. By October the project had raised over $300,000.

The Songwriters Hall of Fame included Lauper in its nomination list in October 2014. Also during October, Lauper's fourth consecutive 'Home for the Holidays' benefit concert for homeless gay youth was announced. Acts included 50 Cent and Laverne Cox with 100% of the net proceeds going to True Colors United

In March 2015, Lauper once again guest starred on the crime show Bones as Avalon Harmonia.

Lauper promoted her work with Novartis and the National Psoriasis Foundation, and discussed her own five years with psoriasis, on The Today Show in July 2015. She also announced a project with producer Seymour Stein, which she later told Rolling Stone was a country album coproduced by Tony Brown.

On September 15, 2015, Kinky Boots opened at the Adelphi Theatre in London's West End.

On August 30, 2017, songwriters Benny Mardones and Robert Tepper sued Lauper for lifting elements from their song "Into the Night" for Kinky Boots final song "Raise You Up". In August 2019, a filed letter by Mardones' lawyer stated that all parties involved have agreed in principle to settle the case. No more details were given at the time.

2016–present: Detour and more
In January 2016, Lauper announced she would release a new album on May 6, 2016. This was composed of her interpretations of early country classics entitled Detour. The announcement was supported by a release of her version of Harlan Howard's "Heartaches by the Number" and a performance on Skyville Live with Kelsea Ballerini and Ingrid Michaelson. On February 17, 2016, she released her version of Wanda Jackson's "Funnel of Love".

In February 2016, Lauper was nominated for an Olivier Award for her contribution to the UK production of Kinky Boots along with Stephen Oremus, the man responsible for the arrangements.  In January 2017, this production's album was nominated for the Grammy Award for Best Musical Theater Album.

In May 2016, Lauper was featured on "Swipe to the Right" from Electronica 2: The Heart of Noise by French producer Jean-Michel Jarre. This second album of the Electronica project is based on collaborations with artists related to electronic music (Tangerine Dream, Moby, Pet Shop Boys, etc.).

In October 2016, her son Dex Lauper was the opening act for her Scottsdale, Arizona and Las Vegas, Nevada dates on her Detour Tour.

In January 2017, Lauper was featured on Austin City Limits 42nd season performing some of her classic songs alongside country tunes from Detour. The episode aired on PBS.

In March 2018, it was announced that Lauper together with co-"Time After Time" songwriter Rob Hyman is going to compose the score for the musical version of the 1988 film Working Girl which starred Melanie Griffith and Sigourney Weaver. She teamed up with Hyman because she wanted "the music to sound like the 80s". The musical will be staged by Tony Award winner Christopher Ashley. A developmental production premiere of the musical is planned for the 2021/2022 season.

For Grandin Road, Lauper exclusively designed her own Christmas collection, 'Cyndi Lauper Loves Christmas', available from September 2018. "I've always loved Christmas, it reminds me to find some happiness in the little things," said Lauper.

Her annual Home For The Holidays concert at the Beacon Theatre in New York was held on December 8, 2018.

Lauper guest starred playing a lawyer in an episode of the reboot of the television series Magnum P.I.. The episode, titled "Sudden Death", aired on October 22, 2018.

On November 15, 2018, it was announced that Lauper would receive the Icon Award at the Billboard's 13th annual Women in Music Event on December 6 in New York City. According to Jason Lipshutz, Billboard's editorial director, "The entire world recognizes the power of Cyndi Lauper's pop music, and just as crucially, she has used her undeniable talent to soar beyond music, create positive change in modern society and become a true icon."

The song "Together" was featured in the Canadian computer-animated film Racetime released in January 2019. Originally written and performed in French by Dumas, Lauper performed the English translation in the English version of the film originally titled La Course des tuques.

On June 26, 2019, Lauper performed at the opening ceremony of Stonewall 50 – WorldPride NYC 2019. Backed by the Hollywood Bowl orchestra, conducted by Thomas Wilkins, Lauper played two concerts on July 12 and 13, 2019 at the iconic Hollywood Bowl.

"Japanese Singles Collection – Greatest Hits" is a 2-disc greatest hits album that includes all of Laupers' singles released in Japan from 1983 to 1995 in chronological order. The second disc contains 26 music videos. Nine of these are available for the first time on DVD. The album was released on September 6, 2019, nine days after its original Japanese release.

In September 2019, it was announced that Lauper would star alongside Jane Lynch in the new Netflix comedy series described as "kind of The Golden Girls for today". As of March 2021, there had not been any updates on this project.

On January 26, 2020, Lauper sang a chorus from the song "I Sing the Body Electric" of the soundtrack from the 1980 movie Fame at the 62nd annual Grammy Awards Show held in Los Angeles. Other performers were Ben Platt, Camila Cabello, Debbie Allen, who starred in the original movie, and more. It was a sendoff to long time Grammy Awards television producer Ken Ehrlich. He retired after a four-decade run of producing the show.

On April 23, 2020, Lauper parti//cipated in an online fundraising concert to raise money for LGBTQ nightlife workers who struggled financially because of the coronavirus pandemic. Lauper ended the concert performing "True Colors". The concert was initiated by the Stonewall Inn Gives Back nonprofit organization of the historic Greenwich Village gay bar. Other performing artists were Kate Pierson, Our Lady J, Rufus Wainwright and Darren Hayes amongst others.

In November 2020, Lauper dueted with former top ten "American Idol" finalist Casey Abrams on a cover version of the song "Eve of Destruction".

In November 2021 Lauper featured as guest vocalist on the track "Blame it on Christmas" by Shea Diamond. An official video was released the following month.

Lauper performed at the 2022 MusiCares Person of the Year Tribute Show honoring Joni Mitchell on April 1.

In May 2022 it was announced that Alison Ellwood will direct a career retrospective documentary about Lauper. The project is already in production but does not yet have a release date. Let The Canary Sing will be the title of this career spanning documentary produced by Sony Music Entertainment.

On 13 December 2022 Lauper and Alex Nolan performed "True Colors" at a White House celebration. That day president Joe Biden signed the Respect for Marriage Act into law. Quote, 'The new law provides federal recognition to same-sex marriages, a measure born out of concern that the Supreme Court could reverse its legal support of such relationships.'

In January 2023 she was among the nominees for the Rock and Roll Hall of Fame, “Seeing my name on this year’s ballot with so many talents that I admire means so much to me,” she adds. “It has been a lifetime privilege to reach so many different kinds of fans with a message of following your own path (and having fun along the way, too).”, said Lauper. The inductees will be revealed in May 2023.

Personal life
Lauper was in a relationship from 1982 to 1988 with her then manager, Dave Wolff.

Lauper has been married to actor David Thornton since 1991. They have one son, born on November 19, 1997.

Lauper has openly discussed her psoriasis, including in advertisements for Cosentyx.

Activism

Lauper has been an LGBT rights supporter throughout her career, campaigning for equality through various charities and gay pride events around the world. Lauper stated that she became involved in gay rights advocacy because her sister Ellen is a lesbian and because Lauper herself was passionate about equality. Lauper cites her sister Ellen as a role model.

Her song "Above the Clouds" celebrates the memory of Matthew Shepard, a young gay man beaten to death in Wyoming. As a member of the Matthew Shepard Foundation Board, Lauper devoted a concert tour in 2005 to promoting the Foundation's message.

She co-founded the True Colors tour for Human Rights throughout the United States and Canada in June 2007. One dollar from each ticket was earmarked for the Human Rights Campaign, which advocates equal rights for LGBT individuals.

In 2008, Lauper started True Colors United (TCU) after learning that, while 10% of American youth identify themselves as LGBT, up to 40% of American homeless youths do so. The organization works to end youth homelessness, focusing on the experiences of LGBT youth. She set up the True Colors Residence in New York City for LGBT homeless youths. The 30-bed facility offers temporary shelter and job placement help. In April 2010, TCU launched the Give a Damn campaign, to help get straight people more involved in LGBT rights. In December 2022, Lauper performed her song True Colors at the ceremony where U.S. President Joe Biden signed the Respect for Marriage Act into law.

In August 2008, she contributed an article titled "Hope" to The Huffington Post, encouraging Americans to vote for Barack Obama in the 2008 United States presidential election. Lauper performed at the 2008 Democratic National Convention.

In 2022, Lauper launched the Girls Just Want To Have Fundamental Rights Fund, with a mission to support organizations “fighting for the right to abortion and reproductive healthcare.”

Legacy
Lauper was described by AllMusic's Lindsay Planer as "an iconoclastic vocalist who revolutionized the role of women in rock and roll". Over her 40-year career, she influenced multiple recording artists including Katy Perry, Lady Gaga, Vanessa Paradis, Tegan and Sara, Kim Petras, and Yelle. Due to her success and influence Lauper has been inducted into both the Hollywood and Songwriters Hall of Fame.

Stephen Thomas Erlewine of Spotify said She's So Unusual and Lauper's distinctive idiosyncratic appearance "helped popularize the image of punk and new wave for America, making it an acceptable part of the pop landscape". Rolling Stone magazine stated that her debut was "arguably the first time explicitly punk-influenced elements were front-and-center on the pop landscape, both musically and via Lauper's Patrick Lucas-styled ensembles, dressing up the droll Reagan decade in feminist chutzpah." The album ranked at No. 487 on Rolling Stones list of 500 Greatest Albums of All Time in 2003. The album ranked at No. 41 on Rolling Stones list of Women Who Rock: The 50 Greatest Albums of All Time in 2012. Rolling Stone's review stated, "A wild and wonderful skyrocket of a voice ... Lauper's extraordinary pipes connect with the right material, the results sound like the beginning of a whole new golden age." Thirty years after its release, Entertainment Weekly called it an "everlastingly saucy supersmash".

Sheila Moeschen argued that "Girls Just Want to Have Fun" "embodied a different kind of feminine aesthetic that ran counter to the raw sensuality and edginess of her contemporaries like Madonna or veteran rockers Joan Jett and Pat Benatar", that introduced "a nation of women to a new kind of female role model, one that celebrated difference and encouraged playfulness in self-expression". John Rockwell wrote that the song was "a giddily upbeat attestation to female pleasure that simultaneously made a feminist statement, fulfilled male fantasies and—especially in its often-played video version—evoked the warmth of family and friends". Its music video won the first-ever Best Female Video prize at the 1984 VMAs. It featured a multicultural cast of women with teased, sideways hair and neon eye shadow, singing alongside Lauper.

"Time After Time" has been covered by over a hundred artists and was ranked at No. 22 on Rolling Stones 100 Best Songs of the Past 25 Years and at No. 19 on VH1's 100 Greatest Songs of the 80s.

"She Bop", the third single from She's So Unusual, is the first and only top ten song to directly mention a gay porn magazine. An ode to masturbation, it was included in the PMRC's "Filthy Fifteen" list that led to the parental advisory sticker appearing on recordings thought to be unsuitable for young listeners. In a retrospective, Rolling Stone ranked it the 36th best song of 1984, praising its unusual playfulness regarding sexuality.

"True Colors" is a gay anthem, after which True Colors United, which advocates for runaway and homeless LGBT youth, is named.

Discography

 She's So Unusual (1983)
 True Colors (1986)
 A Night to Remember (1989)
 Hat Full of Stars (1993)
 Sisters of Avalon (1996)
 Merry Christmas ... Have a Nice Life (1998)
 At Last (2003)
 Shine (2004)
 Bring Ya to the Brink (2008)
 Memphis Blues (2010)
 Detour (2016)

Filmography

Tours

Headlining

Co-headlining

Guest

Awards and nominations

Grammy Awards
The Grammy Awards are awarded annually by the National Academy of Recording Arts and Sciences. Lauper has won two awards from 16 nominations.

|-
|rowspan="5"|1985
|Cyndi Lauper
|Best New Artist
|
|-
|She's So Unusual
|Album of the Year
|
|-
|"Time After Time"
|Song of the Year
|
|-
|rowspan="2"|"Girls Just Want to Have Fun"
|Record of the Year
|
|-
|Best Female Pop Vocal Performance
|
|-
|1986
|"What a Thrill"
|Best Female Rock Vocal Performance
|
|-
|rowspan="2"|1987
|"True Colors"
|Best Female Pop Vocal Performance
|
|-
|"911"
|Best Female Rock Vocal Performance
|
|-
|1988
|"Cyndi Lauper in Paris"
|Best Performance Music Video
|
|-
|1990
|"I Drove All Night"
|Best Female Rock Vocal Performance
|
|-
|1999
|"Disco Inferno"
|Best Dance Recording
|
|-
|2005
|"Unchained Melody"
|Best Instrumental Arrangement Accompanying Vocalist(s)
|
|-
|2009
|Bring Ya to the Brink
|Best Electronic/Dance Album
|
|-
|2011
|Memphis Blues
|Best Traditional Blues Album
|
|-
|2014
|Kinky Boots
|Best Musical Theater Album
|
|-
|2017
|Kinky Boots (Original West End Cast)
|Best Musical Theater Album
|
|}

Tony Awards
The Antoinette Perry Award for Excellence in Theatre, more commonly known informally as the Tony Award, recognizes achievement in live Broadway theatre. The awards are presented by The Broadway League at an annual ceremony in New York City. Lauper is the first woman to win a Tony solo for Best Score.

Emmy Awards
An Emmy Award recognizes excellence in the television industry.

MTV Video Music Award
The MTV Video Music Awards were established in 1984 by MTV to celebrate the top music videos of the year. Lauper won one award from 14 nominations, the first Best Female Video.

|-
|rowspan="9"|1984
|rowspan="6"|"Girls Just Want to Have Fun"
|Video of the Year
|
|-
|Best New Artist
|
|-
|Best Female Video
|
|-
|Best Concept Video
|
|-
|Viewer's Choice
|
|-
|Best Overall Performance
|
|-
|rowspan="3"|"Time After Time"
|Best New Artist
|
|-
|Best Female Video
|
|-
|Best Direction
|
|-
|rowspan="2"|1987
|"True Colors"
|Best Female Video
|
|-
|"What's Going On"
|Best Cinematography
|

Other recognition

See also
 List of artists who reached number one in the United States
 List of awards and nominations received by Cyndi Lauper
 List of number-one dance hits (United States)
 List of number-one hits (United States)

References

External links

 
 
 
 
 
 
 
 Cyndi Lauper Fansite
 "Cyndi Lauper" the song, by Mat Shearer
 Paul Burston, "Cyndi Lauper is Back, and the Girl still wants to Have Fun" (interview), The Times, August 2, 2008
 New York Times feature, 2010

 
1953 births
20th-century American actresses
20th-century American singers
20th-century American women singers
21st-century American actresses
21st-century American singers
21st-century American women singers
Activists from New York City
Actresses from New York City
American dance musicians
American women pop singers
American women rock singers
American women singer-songwriters
American film actresses
American freestyle musicians
American humanitarians
American people of German descent
American people of Swiss descent
American people of Italian descent
American rock songwriters
American sopranos
American soul singers
American television actresses
American voice actresses
Dance-pop musicians
Downtown Records artists
Women new wave singers
Feminist musicians
Grammy Award winners
Johnson State College alumni
American LGBT rights activists
Living people
New York (state) Democrats
Participants in American reality television series
People from Ozone Park, Queens
Primetime Emmy Award winners
Professional wrestling managers and valets
Singers from New York City
Singers with a four-octave vocal range
Sire Records artists
Synth-pop new wave musicians
The Apprentice (franchise) contestants
Tony Award winners
Women humanitarians
Sony BMG artists
Singer-songwriters from New York (state)